Praxibulus is a genus of grasshoppers (Caelifera: Acrididae) found in Australia.

Species
Species include:

References

 
Acrididae genera
Orthoptera of Australia